This article shows a list of railway stations and railway halts in Denmark.

List

Stæremosen railway halt
Støvring station
Svanemøllen station
Svebølle station
Svejbæk station
Svendborg station
Svendborg Vest station
Svenstrup station
Svinninge station
Sydhavn station
Søborg railway halt
Søllested station
Sønderborg station

T
Tarm station
Taulov station
Teglgårdsvej railway halt
Thisted station
Thorsager station

Thyregod station
Tim station
Tinglev station
Tistrup station
Tisvildeleje station
Tjæreborg station
Tokkerup station
Tolne station
Tommerup station
Tornby station
Torsøvej station
Tranbjerg station
Trekroner station
Troldebakkerne railway halt
Troldhede station
Trustrup station
Tureby station
Tølløse station
Tønder station
Tønder Nord station
Tårnby station
Taastrup station

U
Uglev station
Ulfborg station
Ulstrup station

V
Valby station
Vallensbæk station
Vallø station
Vamdrup station
Vangede station
Vanløse station
Varde station
Varde Kasserne station
Varde Nord station
Varde Vest station
Varpelev railway halt
Vedbæk station
Vedde station
Vejby station
Vejen station
Vejle station
Vejle Sygehus station
Veksø station
Vellingshøj station
Vemb station
Vesterport station
Vestre Strandballe station
Vibehus railway halt
Viborg station
Viby J station
Viby Sjælland station
Victoria Street station
Vidstrup station
Vig station
Vigerslev Allé station
Vildbjerg station
Vilhelmsborg railway halt
Vinderup station
Vipperød station
Virum station
Visby station
Vojens station
Vordingborg station
Vrist station
Vrøgum station
Vrå station
Værløse station

Y
Ydby station

Æ
Ærøskøbing station

Ø
Ølby station
Ølgod station
Øllegårdsvej railway halt
Ølsted station
Ølstykke station
Ørby station
Ørestad station
Ørholm railway halt
Østbanetorvet station
Øster Toreby station
Østerbjerg railway halt
Østerport station

Å
Aalborg station
Aalborg Airport station
Aalborg Vestby station
Aalbæk station
Ålholm station
Ålsgårde station
Åmarken station
Århus H station
Årslev station
Aarup station

References

 
Lists of railway stations in Denmark